Hebenstretia cordata, also known by its common name beach slugwort, is a species of flowering plant from the family Scrophulariaceae.

References

Scrophulariaceae
Flora of Africa
Taxa named by Carl Linnaeus
Plants described in 1771